The Oriomo River is located in southern Papua New Guinea. Originating on the Oriomo Plateau, it enters the sea near the town of Daru.

See also
Oriomo-Bituri Rural LLG
Oriomo languages
Oriomo Plateau

References

Rivers of Papua New Guinea